Khosrowshah (also known as Khosrowshahr, Khusraushāh, and Khusroshāh) is a city in Khosrowshah District of Tabriz County, East Azerbaijan province, Iran. At the 2006 census, its population was 12,794 in 3,619 households. The following census in 2011 counted 12,447 people in 3,789 households. The latest census in 2016 showed a population of 21,972 people in 6,870 households.

The city got its name from Khusrau Shah, king of the Justanids during the 10th century. The words "Khosrow" and "Shah" are both Persian words that mean "king."

References 

Tabriz County

Cities in East Azerbaijan Province

Populated places in East Azerbaijan Province

Populated places in Tabriz County